The Nelson H-44 is an American single ignition, four-cylinder, horizontally opposed, direct drive, two-stroke aircraft engine that was developed by the Nelson Engine Company for use in motorgliders.

Design and development
The H-44 was designed in the period following the Second World War and a specially designed motor glider was created by Hawley Bowlus to utilize the engine, the Bowlus/Nelson Dragonfly.

The engine was not certified. Under the CAR 5 regulations then in place in the US for gliders, a certified auxiliary power glider could be flown with a non-certified engine and propeller. The engine is instead described on the Dragonfly type certificate.

The four-cylinder engine runs on a 12:1 mixture of 80 octane gasoline and SAE 30 oil. It is equipped with a single Carter WA1 carburetor and a recoil starter.

Operational history
Employed in the Dragonfly the H-44 proved underpowered, which led to the design of the H-49 version. The engine family was not a success and few were produced.

Variants
H-44
Original design with a  bore and  stroke, producing  at 3900 rpm.
H-49
Upgraded design with E-225 cylinders giving a  bore and  stroke, producing  at 4000 rpm.

Applications
Bowlus/Nelson Dragonfly

Specifications (H-44)

See also

References

Air-cooled aircraft piston engines
Nelson aircraft engines
Two-stroke aircraft piston engines